The men's pole vault event at the 1983 Summer Universiade was held at the Commonwealth Stadium in Edmonton, Canada on 7 and 8 July 1983.

Medalists

Results

Qualification

Final

References

Athletics at the 1983 Summer Universiade
1983